René François Armand "Sully" Prudhomme (16 March 1839 – 6 September 1907) was a French poet and essayist. He was the first winner of the Nobel Prize in Literature in 1901.

Born in Paris, Prudhomme originally studied to be an engineer, but turned to philosophy and later to poetry; he declared it as his intention to create scientific poetry for modern times. In character sincere and melancholic, he was linked to the Parnassus school, although, at the same time, his work displays characteristics of its own.

Early life
Prudhomme was born to a French shopkeeper.

Prudhomme attended the Lycée Bonaparte, but eye trouble interrupted his studies. He worked for a while in the Creusot region for the Schneider steel foundry, and then began studying law in a notary's office. The favourable reception of his early poems by the Conférence La Bruyère (a student society) encouraged him to begin a literary career.

Writing
His first collection, Stances et Poèmes ("Stanzas and Poems", 1865), was praised by Sainte-Beuve. It included his most famous poem, Le vase brisé. He published more poetry before the outbreak of the Franco-Prussian War. This war, which he discussed in Impressions de la guerre (1872) and La France (1874), permanently damaged his health.

During his career, Prudhomme gradually shifted from the sentimental style of his first books towards a more personal style which unified the formality of the Parnassus school with his interest in philosophical and scientific subjects. One of his inspirations was clearly Lucretius's De rerum natura, whose first book he translated into verse. His philosophy was expressed in La Justice (1878) and Le Bonheur (1888). The extreme economy of means employed in these poems has, however, usually been judged as compromising their poetical quality without advancing their claims as works of philosophy. He was elected to the Académie française in 1881. Another distinction, Chevalier de la Légion d’honneur, was to follow in 1895.

After Le Bonheur, Prudhomme turned from poetry to write essays on aesthetics and philosophy. He published two important essays: L'Expression dans les beaux-arts (1884) and Réflexions sur l'art des vers (1892), a series of articles on Blaise Pascal in La Revue des Deux Mondes (1890), and an article on free will (La Psychologie du Libre-Arbitre, 1906) in the Revue de métaphysique et de morale.

Nobel Prize

The first writer to receive the Nobel Prize for Literature (given "in special recognition of his poetic composition, which gives evidence of lofty idealism, artistic perfection and a rare combination of the qualities of both heart and intellect"), he devoted the bulk of the money he received to the creation of a poetry prize awarded by the Société des gens de lettres. He also founded, in 1902, the Société des poètes français with Jose-Maria de Heredia and Leon Dierx.

Death

At the end of his life, his poor health (which had troubled him ever since 1870) forced him to live almost as a recluse at Châtenay-Malabry, suffering attacks of paralysis while continuing to work on essays. He died suddenly on 6 September 1907, and was buried at Père-Lachaise in Paris.

Bibliography

Poetry
 1865: Stances et poèmes
 1866: Les épreuves
 1868: Croquis italiens
 1869: Les solitudes: poésies [Les écuries d’Augias]
 1872: Les destins
 1874: La révolte des fleurs
 1874: La France
 1875: Les vaines tendresses
 1876: Le zénith, previously published in Revue des deux mondes
 1878: La justice
 1865–1888: Poésie
 1886: Le prisme, poésies diverses
 1888: Le bonheur
 1908: Épaves

Prose
 1883–1908: Œuvres de Sully Prudhomme (poetry and prose), 8 volumes, A. Lemerre
 1896: Que sais-je? (philosophy)
 1901: Testament poétique (essays)
 1905: La vraie religion selon Pascal (essays)
 1922: Journal intime: lettres-pensée

References

External links

 
 Gale Contemporary Authors Online, from the Gale Biography Resource Center database
 
 
 britannica.com
 List of works
 Poesies.net: Sully Prudhomme
 Poesies.net: Le Zénith
 
 
 

1839 births
1907 deaths
Writers from Paris
French poets
Members of the Académie Française
Nobel laureates in Literature
French Nobel laureates
Symbolist poets
Burials at Père Lachaise Cemetery
French male essayists
French male poets
19th-century poets
19th-century French male writers
19th-century French essayists